Lyall Glacier is within the Wenatchee National Forest in Chelan County, Washington, United States, and is just southeast of Frisco Mountain. It occupies the north cirque on Rainy Peak. Melt from Lyall Glacier contributes to waterfalls which tumble  into Rainy Lake.

See also

 List of glaciers in the United States

References

Glaciers of the North Cascades
Glaciers of Skagit County, Washington
Glaciers of Washington (state)